KTRK or the Public Broadcasting Corporation of the Kyrgyz Republic is the public broadcasting corporation of the Kyrgyzstan headquartered in Bishkek.
 
The corporation includes 6 TV channels, 5 radio channels, and many studios. The corporation has more than 1000 employees under management. Each TV and radio channel has its own direction. KTRK has a news channel "Ala-Too 24", the sports channel "KTRK Sport", entertainment channel "Music", children's educational channel "Balastan", news information radio "Birinchi", cultural radio "Kyrgyz radiosu", entertaining radio "Min Kiyal FM", peacekeeping radio "Dostuk" and children's radio "Baldar FM". Radio broadcasts commenced in 1931 while the TV broadcasts began in 1958.

History 
The history of the Public Broadcasting Corporation of the Kyrgyz Republic begins in 1931. The official date of the opening of the Kyrgyz radio is on January 20, 1931. On that day the radio station with a length of 25 kilometers was completely commissioned, with a subscriber network of 300 radio points. In 1930, in Frunze began the construction of a standard radio node, and in 1931 it was fully put into operation.

In the Soviet years, Kyrgyz radio certainly played an important role in the life of the Kyrgyz people.  Like other forms of media, it was an instrument of propaganda and was ideologically motivated, but nevertheless it was a radio that carried the necessary information, brought amazing cultural diversity of the country to the listeners. Preservation of the heritage became an important and main task of the Kyrgyz radio after the collapse of the great Soviet country. For 20 years of independence, the Kyrgyz radio developed, improved and fulfilled its main mission - to convey to the listeners the uniqueness of Kyrgyzstan and its people.

In 1926, the Kyrgyz Autonomous region was transformed into the Kyrgyz Autonomous Soviet Socialist Republic. In this regard, in order to spread the news about such a joyous event throughout the entire territory of the country, they raised an initiative of universal radio service. In 1927, this bright idea was realized, and during the Kurultai of the Central Executive Committee of the Kyrgyz ASSR, the people heard the report of Abdykadyr Orozbekov, chairman of the committee, on the radio nodes.

On December 19, 1931, at the People's Commissariat of Soviets of the Kyrgyz ASSR, the Committee on Broadcasting was formed. According to the regulations of the Central Executive Committee, order No. 1 of December 20, 1931, Bektursunov Suyuntbek was appointed as a Chairman of the Republican Committee for Broadcasting, who worked at his post until July 1932. Further, his place is occupied by Kypchakbaev, Sarmanov. Despite the short period of their work, and all the difficulties they had to go through, they were the first initiators to conduct cognitive and instructive hearings through radio.

1938–1945
The first employees of the Kyrgyz radio were composer-improviser Kalyk Akiyev and musician Pyotr Shubin. The first radio announcers were state figure Sakin Begmatova, an artist Aliman Zhangorozova, and writer Kasymaly Bektenov. From 1938 to 1941 poet Tolon Shamshiev was appointed as a chairman of the radio committee. The importance of radio increased during the Great Patriotic War, and soon became the most dominant source of information. In 1945, on March 28, the Committee on Radio Broadcasting was reorganized under the Council of Ministers of the Kyrgyz ASSR.

1945–1964
From 1949 to 1953, the Committee on Broadcasting was headed by the famous playwright and public figure of Moldogazy Tokobayev. Due to the fact that since March 1950, the radio communication of cities, villages and regions of the country had been transferred to the Ministry of Communications of the Kyrgyz ASSR, the Committee on Radio Broadcasting passed under the leadership of the Council of Ministers of the Kyrgyz ASSR.

In 1958, under the Council of Ministers of the Kyrgyz ASSR, the Committee on Television and Radio Broadcasting were established and the Frunzean TV studio started its work. The first speaker of the Kyrgyz television was Sinakan Zhunushalieva, the first director was Januzak Moldobaev, the first editor was Sharsheke Smatov, the first sound engineer was Svetlana Varibada, and the first operator was Kurmanbek Ogobaev.

1964–1985
From 1961 to 1964 the Broadcasting Committee was headed by Aiymbubu Botokanova. Since 1964 the Television and Radio Committee under the Council of Ministers of the Kyrgyz SSR was headed by Asanbek Tokombaev, who had been the head of the state ideological institution for 21 years. Under Asanbek Tokombaev the Television and Radio Committee expanded and became a full-fledged information channel. Asanbek Tokombaev remained in the history of Kyrgyz Television and Radio as a leader with the longest work period. The administrative building of the Television and Radio Corporation, the Radio House and the television studio building were built during the reign of Asanbek Tokombaev.

1985–2007
Since 1985 to 1986 the committee was headed by Asanbek Stamov. Since 1986 to 1991 –by Umtul Orozova. In 1991 the State Agency on Television and Radio of the Kyrgyz Republic was organized, at the head of which Satybaldy Jeenbekov was appointed. In 1992 Tugolbai Kazakov was appointed as a head, in 1993 – Kadyrkul Omurkulov, in 1994 – Abdulamit Matisakov. In 1993 the Agency was again reorganized into a Committee. In 1995 Kyrgyz television was replenished with the studio of morning program “Zamana”.

In 1996, the State Television and Radio Committeewas reorganized into the State Broadcasting Corporation of the Kyrgyz Republic, head of which was appointed Amanbek Karypkulov. Then there were opened information center "Ala-Too", the producer center "Nur", and "Ata-Jurt" in the State Broadcasting Corporation.

In 2001, Moldoseyit Mambetakunov was appointed as a president of the corporation, and in 2002 –Toktosh Aitikeeva. In 2003 the State Television and Radio Corporation of the Kyrgyz Republic acquired the status of the National Broadcasting Corporation of the Kyrgyz Republic.

In 2004, Syartbai Musayev was appointed as a president of the corporation, in 2005 - Sultan Abdrakmanov, and in the same year Kyas Moldokasymov was appointed as a president.

2007–2010
In 2007 Melis Eshimkanov was appointed as a general director of the corporation. In 2009 – Kaiyrgul Orozbai kyzy. In 2010, after the April Revolution, Kubat Otorbaev was appointed as a General Director of the corporation, and on the request of the society the corporation acquired the status of the Public Broadcasting Corporation of the Kyrgyz Republic. The order on the Public Broadcasting Corporation was signed by the President of the Kyrgyz Republic. In 2010 there was elected the supervisory board of the Public Broadcasting Corporation, which includes 15 members. Elvira Sarieva was elected as a chairman of the supervisory board. In December 2010 according to the results of contest Kubat Otorbaev had been elected as a General Director of KTRK for 5 years.

2011–2017
On July, 2014, Kubat Otorbaev applied for resignation at his own request, which was adopted by a majority vote of the KTRK Supervisory Board. The supervisory board assigned the duties of the corporation's General Director to the well-known journalist Sultanbek Zhumagulov, who at that time was the head of the television channel “ElTR”. On November 23, 2014, Sultanbek Zhumagulov was elected for the post of General Director. During the reign of Sultanbek. Zhumagulov as the General Director of KTRK, the news block of the channel was updated, and a new Osh TV studio was opened. After his resignation, the supervisory board of the Public Broadcasting Corporation assigned the duties of the General Director on Ilimbek Karypbekov. On March 19, 2015, Ilimbek Karypbekov was appointed as a General Director of KTRK with an absolute majority of votes of the members of theSupervisory Board. As a chairman of the supervisory board was elected poet and TV journalist Abdy Satarov.

Currently, the corporation has 6 TV channels: “Public First Channel”, “KTRK Music”, “Madaniyat-Taryh-Til”, “Balastan”, "KTRK Sport" and "Ala-Too 24". Also, there are 5 radio stations in the KTRK: “Birinci Radio”, “Kyrgyz Radiosu”, “Min Kyal FM”, “Dostuk” and “Baldar FM”. The corporation also includes the Republican Radio Telecentre, the studio "Kyrgyztelefilm".

2022
The Public Broadcasting Corporation (OTRK) became the National Television and Radio Broadcasting Corporation (NTRK) in May 2022.

TV channels

Ala-Too 24
The first round-the-clock informational channel in Kyrgyzstan “Ala-Too 24” began broadcasting on September 12, 2016. The TV channel is the part of the digital television family of the Public Broadcasting Corporation of the Kyrgyz Republic.

The basis of the Channel is, informational, analytical, cultural and educational programs. The main purpose of the Channel - the formation of a wide information space.

Madaniyat.Taryh.Til
The concept of the TV channel is to create and distribute broadcasts on various topics: music, art, literature, a reflection of the cultural diversity of nations, as well as education, preservation and development of the national traditions of the Kyrgyz people and patriotism. The mission of the channel is to promote in the person the best human qualities like integrity, pursuit of knowledge and enlightenment and humanity.

Balastan
"Balastan” is the first children's TV channel in Kyrgyzstan. It has been broadcasting since October 1, 2013.

The channel is educationally informative and oriented for children of school and pre-school age and their parents.
The channel presents developing children's programs, interesting programs and films that give children the opportunity to plunge into the wonderful world of discoveries and knowledge. “Balastan” answers to many questions of quick-witted children and share interesting knowledge with their friends. “Balastan” also introduces its young viewers with the news happening in the world of children or entertains them with its interesting bright children's shows and concerts. “Balastan” - happy laughter of children and joy in every family!

It broadcasts via cable channels in the Chui region, in the social package of digital broadcasting “Kyrgyztelecom” in the Osh and Jalal-Abad regions. From January 2014, the channel began to broadcast in the Batken region.

KTRK Sport
“KTRK Sport” is the first sports channel in Kyrgyzstan, which is part of the television family of the Public Broadcasting Corporation. The channel is specialized in creation and distribution of television products on sports topics.
Considering the increased interest in sports around the world in general and in Kyrgyzstan, in particular, the channel's mission is to promote development of sport in the country, healthy lifestyles and attract young people to sport, spread and promote national types of sports.

Broadcasting the sport competitions is the basis of the broadcasting policy of the “KTRK Sport” channel, it occupies more than 50% of the airtime of the channel. Viewers of the channel can watch live broadcasting of the largest competitions held in the country and in the world, including the Olympic and Asian Games, national types of sport, World and European championships in football, athletics, hockey and other sports.

KTRK Music
“KTRK Music” is the main music channel in Kyrgyzstan, which has been broadcasting since October 1, 2012. On music channel you can watch the most fashionable clips of Kyrgyz and foreign performers and many other interesting programs. “KTRK Music” is the only music channel included in the digital television package, which is available to every citizen of Kyrgyzstan; the channel's coverage is 98% of the Kyrgyz audience. Moreover, “KTRK Music” broadcasts through satellite and cable networks of the country.

Radio stations

Birinchi Radio
Public Radio station "Birinchi Radio" - one of the main and first radio stations of the country. For the first time, the call signs of the station were sounded on the “first button” of the wired broadcast. Today, “Birinchi Radio” has the most powerful radio signal distribution network in the country - these are transmitters. In addition to FM waves, programs of “Birinchi Radio” sounds in all regions on ultra-short waves, as well as in real-audio mode on the Internet and satellite.

More than 6 million people in Kyrgyzstan and listeners in foreign and neighboring countries have the technical ability to receive a signal. Based on the task of implementing the state policy in the field of ensuring the information security of the country, “Birinchi Radio” of Public Broadcasting Corporation of the Kyrgyz Republic comes out with the concept of popular information broadcasting in the FM band.

Public Radio station “Birinchi Radio” is positioned as All Talk Radio, i.e. radio "about all". In other words, this is the only radio station in Kyrgyzstan that disseminates accurate and complete information about political and economic events, culture and sports news 18 hours a day, in the near future 24 hours. This means that in our program policy we are guided by an understanding of the priority of the audience's need for timely and reliable information.

Kyrgyz Radiosu
The radio format is cultural and educational. In the air literary-dramatic, spiritual-educational programs, radio performances, archival programs from the "Golden Fund", classical and folk music. The radio station is aimed at an audience from 30 to 70 years old, leading a measured lifestyle, striving for knowledge of the Kyrgyz culture and its development.

Broadcasting - 18 hours a day, seven days a week.

Dostuk
Radio "Dostuk" broadcasts online on the website www.ktrk.kg in educational, literary and musical format.
The main objective of the radio "Dostuk" - the glorification of multilingualism and friendship of peoples, the creation of high-quality radio programs, deepen and expand the dialogue with listeners and also to educate young people in such important cultural areas as music, literature, cinema and theater. To acquaint with classical models and cult personalities in these areas, as well as highlight recent achievements worthy of attention. Thereby expanding the horizons of young people, increasing their education, help to cultivate taste in the best achievements of literature, music, cinema and theater.

Broadcasting - 9 hours a day. Programs are broadcast in Kyrgyz, Russian, Polish, Ukrainian, Dungan, Uygur, Tatar, Uzbek, Turkish languages.

Min-Kiyal FM
Music and entertainment channel, which broadcasts 24/7. “Min Kiyal FM” radio station is focused on modern music for adults. There are only the hits of the Kyrgyz estrade, folklore, pop and other cultural programs on the air of the radio.

Baldar FM
“Baldar FM” is the only radio station in Kyrgyzstan, which is entirely dedicated to children and teenagers under 16 years of age. There are educational programs for the younger generation on the air. Radio is aired on weekends in the wave of “Birinchi Radio”.

See also
 Media in Kyrgyzstan

References

External links
Official site
About KTRK
prezi.com
 КТРК

Publicly funded broadcasters
Television stations in Kyrgyzstan
Television channels and stations established in 1958
State media
Radio in Kyrgyzstan
1958 establishments in the Soviet Union